Dune is a 1992 adventure strategy video game, based upon Frank Herbert's science fiction novel of the same name. It was developed by Cryo Interactive and published by Virgin Interactive.

Dune blends adventure with economic and military strategy. Loosely following the story of the novel, the game casts the player as Paul Atreides, with the ultimate goal of driving the Harkonnen from Planet Dune, while managing spice extraction, military, and later, ecology through the native Fremen tribes. As the player progresses, his troops are equipped with weapons from "crysknives" to atomics, tap into Paul's latent psychic powers and get acquainted with such characters from the book as Chani and Liet-Kynes.

Released for the Amiga and IBM PC compatibles, it was one of the first floppy games to be converted to CD format, which included footage of the David Lynch film, voice-acting for all speaking roles, and highly improved, 3D-rendered traveling and location screens. This version, a mix of the Amiga graphics and the extras of the PC-CD version, was also released on the Sega CD / Mega CD console.

The audio track, created by Stéphane Picq and Philip Ulrich, was released by Cryo (formerly Exxos) on the album Dune: Spice Opera.

Gameplay 

The story is mostly based on the plot of the Dune novel: the player is Paul Atreides, son of Duke Leto Atreides and Lady Jessica. The House Atreides was given an irrefusable offer by the Emperor Shaddam IV – mine the spice from the desert planet Arrakis, occupied by their longtime arch-enemies: the House Harkonnen. Duke Leto accepts the offer not only because of the wealth provided by Spice trading, but also to defeat the Harkonnens.

The game, seen always through the eyes of Paul, is a mix between real-time strategy and an adventure game. While the basis of the game is the strategy component, dialog between characters and a linear plotline give the game more depth than most strategy games. The player is also required to do some miniquests involving talking to characters and traveling to locations, which adds a small adventure game element.

There must be a balance between military and spice mining power. While having a strong military force will provide fast response to the Harkonnen, if Spice is not mined fast enough to keep up with the Emperor's demands, the game will be lost. However, if there is too much focus on spice mining, Harkonnen troops can ambush a sietch, capturing all troops inside. They can only be rescued if the sietch is liberated. Since the game is as much resource managing as military conquest, balancing both is the key for successful completion.

Dune consists of two interwoven gameplay layers: an adventure layer reminiscent of dungeon crawler games, and a top-down strategy layer more reminiscent of 4X games. The player may switch between these two layers at will, to carry out completely different sets of activities required to win the game.

The adventure layer allows the player to move about short distances, whether inside structures (e.g. the Arrakeen palace, or a sietch) or to walk out into the desert. The strategy layer shows the entire planet Arrakis and allows surveying (and later controlling) Paul's assets in the Spice-mining effort and the fight against the Harkonnen.

The game runs in real-time, measuring both the time of day (with corresponding changes to the in-game visuals) as well as the number of days elapsed since the beginning of the game. The flow of time is crucial and it passes at the same pace regardless of which layer is being viewed.

Gameplay evolves in a manner that responds to the evolution of the story itself. As the story progresses, more and more options become available, mirroring Paul's gradual growth as a leader to the Fremen and a danger to House Harkonnen and the Emperor.

The game begins with Paul at the Arrakeen palace, his family's new residence on Dune. The very early game involves moving around the palace to meet and have conversations with his family members and trusted advisors, introducing the player to the game's setting.

Conversations in Dune are interactive to a limited degree, with the player able to occasionally select responses in order to advance the plot – but most dialogue options simply command the other character to divulge pertinent strategic information, or to carry out some relevant action in the game world. For example, Duncan Idaho can be asked to give a detailed report on the current status of the Atreides Spice-mining operation, or to send a shipment of Spice to the Emperor. A few characters can be commanded to join Paul in his travels.

Soon enough, Paul is sent out by his father Duke Leto to contact the local Fremen tribes and attempt to convince them to work for House Atreides, which has no military or spice-mining forces of its own. Travel to those Fremen  must be done by Ornithopter, by selecting the destination or a general direction and flying there in a straight line. During flight, it is possible to spot certain points of interest from the air. Certain characters who are currently following Paul may increase the probability of spotting such locations. Every visited location (or one whose position had been reported by a character during dialogue with them) is shown on the "select destination" map. The travel sequence can be skipped, but the flight time is calculated and the in-game clock will be advanced accordingly once the destination is reached. Once a Fremen sietch is reached, Paul may converse with the local chieftain to attempt to convince the Fremen to join the Atreides. Though most chieftains will agree immediately, some require further convincing and Paul would need to perform some specific action or raise his reputation score before they will agree to work for him.

Once at least one tribe has been recruited, the strategy layer becomes unlocked. This layer allows Paul to direct his troops to move to any known location on the planet. It also provides a small interface to examine the availability of spice in each sector of the map (once Spice prospectors have been recruited as well). Finally, any Fremen tribe can be instructed to pick up spice-mining equipment (which increases their mining efficiency) if it is available at their current location, or even to search nearby  for such equipment. Tribe movement between  takes place in real-time. Tribes will automatically begin to mine Spice at their current location and will continue doing so until the Spice runs out. Spice is automatically moved to the Atreides' stores at Arrakeen, requiring no logistics for its transportation.

Once Spice begins to accumulate, the Emperor will begin to make demands for Spice shipments. These are received in a communications room at the palace and must be fulfilled within a certain period of time, otherwise the game will end with the Emperor invading Dune and destroying the Atreides. This adds a dimension of gameplay wherein the player must calculate how often they must return to Arrakeen (Atreides Palace), since each shipment requires manual confirmation. Duncan can be instructed to send more or less than the requested amount of Spice (assuming it is available), in order to preserve spice or delay the next request, respectively. Spice also serves as a currency that can be used to purchase additional mining (and later military) equipment from Smuggler camps, which will be marked on the map as the game progresses.

As the story develops, Paul will discover more  and gather more and more Spice-mining tribes. This scripted event pushes the game into the next stage: creating a military force to defend  and ultimately take the fight into Harkonnen territory. To start, Paul must complete certain plot objectives by traveling to specific destinations and conversing with certain characters, primarily Stilgar. Once the requirements are fulfilled, Paul can instruct tribes to switch from Spice-mining activity to military training. Such a tribe can then be equipped with any available weaponry, instead of mining equipment, to increase its combat efficiency. Military tribes can also train to increase their prowess and morale, more-so if Gurney Halleck is told to remain at the sietch where the military forces are training. Once ready, military tribes can be sent to scout out Harkonnen fortresses and attack them. Attacking tribes must outnumber and out-equip the Harkonnen defenders of a fortress in order to win, otherwise they might be destroyed and / or taken captive. Morale also plays a strong part in a military tribe's effectiveness and Paul himself can influence a battle's outcome by traveling to the site of a battle and issuing generalized combat orders (cautious vs. aggressive). This is very risky to Paul himself and can result in him being killed in that battle. If a battle is won, Paul might be able to interrogate to fortress' previous commander for more information and possibly release any tribes held captive there. Over time, a captured fortress will be turned into a new sietch.

An alternative (or complementary) option to direct combat is to start a terraforming project on Dune, setting certain tribes to work on ecology. This option becomes available only after completing a plot thread involving Liet-Kynes. Ecology tribes can construct a wind trap (or use an existing one) at a sietch to begin accumulating water and then be equipped with plant bulbs which they will automatically plant wherever they go. The bulbs will grow into vegetation (seen growing on both the strategy and adventure layers) and will expand northwards over time from the location where they are planted. Vegetation rapidly destroys any spice still left in the soil in any region it expands into. As such, if it ever reaches a Harkonnen fortress, the Harkonnen will lose interest in that region and abandon it without a fight. This method is very time-consuming and will destroy any potential spice-mining prospects in the affected areas, but in conjunction with the military campaign can nevertheless pay off strategically. An important side-benefit to terraforming is that it increases the morale of all Fremen tribes, thereby increasing their efficiency at whatever they are currently doing.

Early on in the scripted storyline, Paul will begin to have visions of events occurring far from his current location. As time passes and more plot events occur, Paul's telepathic ability will become more and more pronounced. At first, this ability will allow Paul to instantly know whenever a message has been received at the palace (including the all-important demands for Spice from the Emperor). Later on, Paul will be able to contact and command Fremen tribes a short distance from his position on the map. As the game progresses, the range of Paul's telepathic ability will increase, until it eventually spans the entire planet. Furthermore, the Fremen will eventually teach Paul to ride sandworms (as an alternative to Ornithopter flight), which can be used to approach Harkonnen fortresses more safely and further increase the odds of victory in battle.

The ultimate goal of the game is to destroy all or most of the Harkonnen fortresses, coming within striking distance of the Harkonnen palace, Arrakeen, which is near the north pole of Dune. Then, a massive army must be collected in order to make the final assault and win the game.

Development

Groundwork 
Martin Alper, the founder of Mastertronic (later renamed Virgin Interactive), was fascinated by the novel Dune and had been trying to buy the interactive adaptation rights since 1988. He conducted a study to measure the viability of such an adaptation, estimating that there were between 3 and 4 million fans of the novel in the United States. He found that Dino De Laurentiis, the producer of David Lynch's film Dune, held the adaptation rights. Following the release of the film, the production company had gone bankrupt. After the death of Frank Herbert, there were several legal trials to determine who then owned the rights. Martin Alper was finally able to buy the rights from Universal Pictures in the spring of 1990.

The first links between the future French company Cryo Interactive, born out of the ashes of ERE Informatique and Virgin Interactive were forged when Philippe Ulrich met Jean-Martial Lefranc, recently appointed director of Virgin Loisirs by Patrick Zelnik. Lefranc was an admirer of Ulrich's team, especially for its recent release of Captain Blood, for which Ulrich was scenario designer. On 20 July 1990, he organized a meeting between Frank Herman, head of the group in London and Ulrich's team. Herman promised them a meeting with Martin Alper, president of Virgin Games USA.

Rémi Herbulot met with Martin Alper in Los Angeles to pitch three video games, all with strong science fiction elements. In response, Alper proposed to Herbulot the idea of adapting the Dune novel to a video game format, as he held those rights. The rights agreement between the groups was finalized in August 1990, during a dinner at Fouquet's, in the presence of Philippe Ulrich and Frank Herman.

Pre-production 
A team of developers, mostly Frank Herbert fans, began to work on the project. The team worked for 6 months on paper and organized weekly meetings. Ulrich met the game's producer, David Bishop, of whom he had heard conflicting reports in the past. Bishop expressed his desire to design the game himself. In the first few months of development, the documents that the developers sent to the United States did not convince Virgin. Communication was relayed through Bishop in London, who did not defend the project. The Americans at Virgin Games criticized the game for its "French aesthetic" and too-prominent user interface. They also were not convinced that the proposed mixture of adventure and strategy gameplay elements would succeed.

To give the development team a more defined framework, Philippe Ulrich created a new label within Virgin Interactive: Cryo Entertainment.

Trouble 
On 19 September 1990, after a change in management, Virgin threatened to cancel the production. No contract had yet been signed; the developers feared all their work would be lost.

Frank Herman managed to salvage the project, but the American backers, including Martin Alper, pulled out. Alper entrusted the electronic adaptation rights of Dune to an American studio, Westwood Studios, at a meeting in Las Vegas.

The developers, working on the game practically in secret, ended up with a design document more than 100 pages long.

The game was inspired by the novel by Frank Herbert, but also by David Lynch's film. Feyd-Rautha, for example, retained the likeness of Sting, but the majority of the characters were completely redesigned by Jean-Jacques Chaubin. Also adapted from the film is the "weirding module", a weapon that does not exist in the novel. The graphics were created for VGA 256 color mode. In early 1991, the Gulf War seemed to echo the themes of Dune and Ulrich was inspired to integrate images recalling the night bombing of Baghdad into the game.

In April 1991, Sega bought Virgin's European operations and Cryo lost Jean-Martial Lefranc, its intermediary with the publisher's general management. Their new manager, Christian Brecheteau, discovered that Virgin Entertainment had financed Cryo in secret, but fortunately expressed interest in the project. An audit of the accounts of Sega France, which absorbed Virgin Loisirs, was carried out. Management now realized that the development of Dune in France was still being funded, while Sega had not obtained the Dune license.

Members of the Cryo team rushed to London to meet with Martin Alper to present their work samples and hopefully save the project. Alper and Bishop were excited by the early prototypes and they reversed their cancellation decision, despite still having another Dune project under development. They gave Cryo five weeks to present a prototype able to satisfy the American public.

The plot was modified from the novel and the developers chose to start the game with the arrival of Paul on Arrakis. A few weeks later, they sent a prototype to the United States. Alper was impressed not only by the game but also by the soundtrack, which he wanted to release on CD. In September 1991, he signed the game Dune and a second game, KGB, which Ulrich had proposed to him at the European Computer Trade Show in London in 1990. In October, the game was in pre-beta, with a demo version planned. On 27 September, Virgin Games USA signed an agreement with Sega for an adaptation of Dune for Mega-CD.

Aftermath 
In January 1992, after this comeback, Ulrich, Herbulot and Lefranc spun off Cryo Interactive as an independent company. Cryo's Dune arrived in stores before Westwood's game, which was eventually renamed Dune II. The development of Dune cost 3 million francs, of which 800,000 was used by Cryo. With the signing of the distribution contract, Cryo was granted a budget of 600,000 francs.

Cryo planned a number of ports, to Atari ST, Amiga, CD32, Super NES and possibly the NES and Master System. Most never saw the light of day. Philippe Ulrich also planned a sequel to the game, which this time would place the player on the side of the Harkonnens.

Dune was one of the first floppy disk games to be ported to the new CD format. This was thanks to Ulrich's willingness to exploit this new medium, despite initial opposition from David Bishop. The Sega Mega-CD version had graphics close to the Amiga version's, but offered the extras of the DOS CD-ROM version: snippets from Lynch's film, voice acting and new travelling animations.

Mega placed the game at No. 10 in their Top Mega CD Games of All Time.

Packaging 
Dune was the first video game to make use of the game cover printed on a sleeve and then slipped over a pre-printed, Virgin Games-branded contents box. Before this game was released the industry printed expensive individual boxes for each and every game or they printed wraps that were glued to a box but that took extra processing time. This sleeve-box combo became the industry standard for video game boxes for the next two decades. The new sleeve-styled box was created by Anthony Mesaros for the US office of Virgin Games. He had created the sleeve design because he wanted to be able to get flashy covers printed in several colors as well as foil and yet create a box that cost significantly less than printing the individual game covers on individual boxes. His new packaging design not only came in at a much lower cost but had required less than half the turnaround time for actual printing.

Audio 

Dune: Spice Opera was released by Virgin Records in 1992. The tracks were composed by Stéphane Picq and Philippe Ulrich. Virgin Records was later sold to EMI, which then became the new holders of the copyright. Picq wished to have the rights in order to re-release the album, though they were not granted.

Reception 
Dune was commercially successful, with sales of 20,000 units in its first week alone. By 1997, it had sold 300,000 units. Cryo Interactive's Philippe Ulrich later noted that the company had "bet a lot on the explosion of the PC and the CD-ROM" with Dune, and that the game's hit status was heavily responsible for Cryo's quick growth.

Maxwell Eden for Computer Gaming World wrote in September 1992 that the developer "had succeeded in distilling the book's complex plot into a game that involves the player in the outcome". It praised the graphics and animation, and concluded that the game was "a light and interesting challenge" easy enough for most players to finish. In April 1994 the magazine said of the CD version that "many of the actors come off better on the PC screen than they fared in the real cinema, and the addition of digitized speech spices up many of the dull parts of the game". QuestBusters wrote: "I really enjoyed this game, a high quality product with many surprisingly entertaining aspects". Because of the strategic aspects it recommended the game to those who enjoyed both strategy games and graphic adventures. Electronic Gaming Monthly gave the Sega CD version an 8 out of 10, describing it as "involving", and praising the digitized graphics and flight sequences.

Later games 
In 1992 software company Westwood Studios produced a rival Dune game also for Virgin Interactive, Dune II: The Building of a Dynasty. Westwood later produced two sequels, Dune 2000 in 1998 and Emperor: Battle for Dune in 2001. Cryo returned to the Dune universe in 2001 with Frank Herbert's Dune, the financial failure of which bankrupted Cryo Interactive, causing the nearly finished Dune Generations to never be released.

References

External links 

 Dune at MobyGames

1992 video games
Adventure games
Amiga games
Cryo Interactive games
DOS games
Sega CD games
Video games based on Dune (franchise)
Video games developed in France
Video games set on fictional planets
Virgin Interactive games
Single-player video games